The Executive Council of New Brunswick, informally and more commonly, the Cabinet of New Brunswick, is the cabinet of the Canadian province of New Brunswick.

Almost always made up of members of the Legislative Assembly of New Brunswick, the Cabinet is similar in structure and role to the Cabinet of Canada while being smaller in size.  As federal and provincial responsibilities differ there are a number of different portfolios between the federal and provincial governments.

The Lieutenant-Governor of New Brunswick, as representative of the Queen in Right of New Brunswick, appoints the council which advises them on the governance of the province, and is referred to as the Lieutenant-Governor in Council. Members of the Cabinet, who advise, or minister, the viceroy, are recommended by the Premier of New Brunswick and appointed by the Lieutenant-Governor. Most cabinet ministers are the head of a ministry, but this is not always the case.

As at the federal level the most important Cabinet post after that of the leader is Minister of Finance.  Today the next most powerful position is certainly the health portfolio which has a vast budget and is of central political import.  Other powerful portfolios include Education, Family & Community Services, Natural Resources and Transportation.

Current Cabinet
The current cabinet is led by Premier Blaine Higgs. The governing party is the Progressive Conservatives.

References

External links
Cabinet as of September 29, 2020
Cabinet as of February 21, 2020
Cabinet as of November 9, 2018
Cabinet as of October 5, 2018
Cabinet as of May 11, 2018
Cabinet as of September 5, 2017
Cabinet as of June 6, 2016
Cabinet as of October 7, 2014
Cabinet as of September 23, 2013
Cabinet as of October 9, 2012
Cabinet as of March 15, 2012
Cabinet as of October 12, 2010
Cabinet as of May 10, 2010
Cabinet as of January 4, 2010
Cabinet as of June 22, 2009
Cabinet as of November 12, 2008
Cabinet as of October 31, 2007
Cabinet as of October 3, 2006
Cabinet as of February 14, 2006 
Cabinet as of June 27, 2003
Cabinet as of October 9, 2001
Cabinet as of March 23, 2000
Cabinet as of June 21, 1999